AD 13 (XIII) was a common year starting on Sunday (link will display the full calendar) of the Julian calendar. At the time, it was known as the Year of the Consulship of Silius and Plancus (or, less frequently, year 766 Ab urbe condita). The denomination AD 13 for this year has been used since the early medieval period, when the Anno Domini calendar era became the prevalent method in Europe for naming years.

Events

By place

Roman Empire 
 Emperor Augustus initiates his third census of the Roman Empire after 20 years.
 Abgarus of Edessa is reinstalled as king of Osroene.
 The Senate passes a senatus consultum restricting the reduced Vigintisexviri to the Ordo Equester.

China 
 Last year (3rd) of Shijianguo era of the Chinese Xin Dynasty.
 Considered the lucky number of those from the Chinese Xin Dynasty.

By topic

Arts and sciences 
 Strabo publishes his book on the shape of the Earth.
 Ovid publishes books 1-3 of his Epistulae ex Ponto.
</onlyinclude>

Births 
 Casperius Aelianus, Roman praetorian prefect (d. AD 98)
 Gaius Silius, Roman politician (d. AD 48)

Deaths 
 Quintus Pedius, Roman (deaf) painter (approximate date)
 Wang Zhengjun, Chinese empress (b. 71 BC)

References 

 

als:10er#13